Montreux Concert is a live album by American jazz pianist Don Pullen recorded in 1977 at the Montreux Jazz Festival and released on the Atlantic label.

Reception
The Allmusic review by Scott Yanow awarded the album 4 stars stating "A masterful inside/outside pianist whose percussive solos often made his music sound more accessible than one would expect (considering the fact that he often played atonally), Don Pullen is heard on two extensive side-long explorations".

Track listing
All compositions by Don Pullen except as indicated
 "Richard's Tune" (Muhal Richard Abrams) - 18:10 
 "Dialogue Between Malcolm and Betty" - 21:47 
Recorded at the Montreux International Festival, Switzerland on July 12, 1977

Personnel
 Don Pullen — piano
Jeff Berlin — electric bass  
Steve Jordan — drums 
Raphael Cruz, Sammy Figueroa — percussion  (track 2)

References

1977 live albums
Don Pullen albums
Atlantic Records live albums